This is a listing of the national archery records for Lithuania.

Men's records

Women's records

See also
 List of Lithuanian records

References

External links
Lithuanian Archery Federation

Records
Archery records
National records in archery
Archery